SARM Division No. 6 is a division of the Saskatchewan Association of Rural Municipalities (SARM) within the Canadian province of Saskatchewan. It is located in the north west area of the province. There are 48 rural municipalities in this division. The current spot for the Director of Division 6 is Rodney Wiens.

List of Rural Municipalities in Division No. 6

by numerical RM #

 RM No. 287 St. Andrews
 RM No. 288 Pleasant Valley
 RM No. 290 Kindersley
 RM No. 292 Milton
 RM No. 317 Marriott
 RM No. 318 Mountain View
 RM No. 319 Winslow
 RM No. 320 Oakdale
 RM No. 321 Prairiedale
 RM No. 322 Antelope Park
 RM No. 347 Biggar
 RM No. 349 Grandview
 RM No. 350 Mariposa
 RM No. 351 Progress
 RM No. 352 Heart's Hill
 RM No. 377 Glenside
 RM No. 378 Rosemount
 RM No. 379 Reford
 RM No. 380 Tramping Lake
 RM No. 381 Grass Lake
 RM No. 382 Eye Hill
 RM No. 405 Great Bend
 RM No. 406 Mayfield
 RM No. 409 Buffalo
 RM No. 410 Round Valley
 RM No. 411 Senlac
 RM No. 436 Douglas
 RM No. 437 North Battleford
 RM No. 438 Battle River
 RM No. 439 Cut Knife
 RM No. 440 Hillsdale
 RM No. 442 Manitou Lake
 RM No. 466 Meeting Lake
 RM No. 467 Round Hill
 RM No. 468 Meota
 RM No. 469 Turtle River
 RM No. 470 Paynton
 RM No. 471 Eldon
 RM No. 472 Wilton
 RM No. 496 Spiritwood
 RM No. 497 Medstead
 RM No. 498 Parkdale
 RM No. 499 Mervin
 RM No. 501 Frenchman Butte
 RM No. 502 Brittania
 RM No. 561 Loon Lake
 RM No. 588 Meadow Lake
 RM No. 622 Beaver River

Footnotes

External links
SARM Division No. 6 members

SARM divisions of Saskatchewan